The  (Lutra nippon) or Japanese river otter is an extinct species of otter formerly widespread in Japan.

Dating back to the 1880s, it was even seen in Tokyo. The population suddenly shrank in the 1930s, and the mammal nearly vanished. Since then, it has only been spotted several times, in 1964 in the Seto Inland Sea, and in the Uwa Sea in 1972 and 1973. The last official sighting was in the southern part of Kōchi Prefecture in 1979, when it was photographed in the mouth of the Shinjo River in Susaki. It was subsequently classified as a "Critically Endangered" species on the Japanese Red List. On August 28, 2012, the Japanese otter was officially declared extinct by the Ministry of the Environment. It is the official animal symbol of Ehime Prefecture.

Taxonomy 
All river otters of Japan were described in the 19th century as a subspecies of the Eurasian otter, Lutra lutra whiteleyi. In the early 1990s, a comparison of mitochondrial cytochrome b of otters from Latvia and China, and a stuffed otter from Japan, made by Kōchi University, found that the Japanese otter belonged to a distinct species, which was named Lutra nippon. This classification was not generally accepted in the absence of further verification, but later studies have reaffirmed a heavy level of genetic divergence between L. lutra and L. nippon, with a 2019 study finding L. nippon to fall outside the subspecific clade in L. lutra, and the American Society of Mammalogists has since reclassified it as a distinct species. However, according to the 2019 study, significant controversy remains over the status of L. nippon as a distinct species, and its taxonomic status thus remains uncertain.

Only the otters of Honshu, Kyushu, and Shikoku belong to L. nippon. The subspecific taxon L. l. whiteleyi is still valid for the also disappeared otter of Hokkaido.

Description 
It had a thick, lush coat of dark brown fur with short webbed feet. In addition the river otter has two types/sets of fur. Data has shown that the river otter would shed their under fur fully from May to August. After the shedding of the under fur, the otter shed their guard hair from August to November. This allowed them to adjust to the seasons changing. The otter had a lifespan of up to 25 years.

Ecology and biology

Habits 
A nocturnal creature, an otter only left its den after dark to forage for food. Claiming a territory about ten miles in diameter, it marked the area with its droppings about one to three miles apart and sets up three or four nests under rocks or inside bushes. The otters were always on the move, visiting each den only once every three to four days. They were considered an adult after only one year. They would then venture on their own, but continue in solitude unless ready to mate.

Reproduction 
In general, the Japanese otter was ready to reproduce when they were two to three years old. In addition, the males sought out the females in the reproduction process. Besides during reproduction and with the exception of young males staying with their mother for a range of two to three years until they were mature, female otters and male otters did not generally live together. When a male otter calls out to a female otter, she must give him permission for the mating. If she does not, the male would move onto the next female otter. For the male to know that the female is interested in mating, the female will roll around with the male, which releases hormones. The Japanese river otter could have anywhere from one to six offspring per litter. Once born, the baby otters are completely blind for a month, leaving them utterly helpless. The female otter makes for a great mother; nursing her young for up to eight hours a day, as well as teaching them valuable lessons and protecting them. After the pups are around the age of four months, the mother otter will introduce her youth to solid food and start to teach them how to hunt.

Diet 
Like most otters, the Japanese otter was not an especially picky eater. While it primarily fed on fish, crab, and shrimp; it also ate eels, beetles, watermelons, and sweet potatoes. Many of these Japanese otters eat about 15% to 25% of their own body weight. Many otters spend around six hours to find food because of their difficult living space and their competition for food. The Japanese otter was known as one of the top carnivores in the aquatic food chain.

Cause of extinction 
In the past, there were thousands of river otters in Japan. Starting in the Meiji period, the government of Japan adopted a policy of increasing wealth and military prowess. Animal pelts thus became very valuable since they could be exported for money. As a result, Japanese river otters started to be hunted throughout the country. Their numbers soon dwindled. Populations made a slight comeback after the creation of hunting regulations. Even so, pollution and human development then harmed their environment and resources to build their habitats. This pollution terminated their food sources in the rivers, causing them to hunt in more dangerous settings. These causes grew rapidly, resulting in the extinction of the Japanese river otter in the late 20th century.

Search efforts 
Throughout the 1990s, there were several attempts to locate a surviving Japanese otter.

In December 1991, the Environmental Agency of Japan, in partnership with the Kochi prefectural government, assembled a research team of experts and began their search. In March 1992, the research group found hair and excrement in Kochi Prefecture and believed to have come from an otter. Also found were three footprints, and ten additional excrement samples. After an analysis of a cross-section of the hair, the researchers determined that it came from an otter. An official from the agency's wildlife protection section stated that the hair was "scientifically solid evidence that confirms the existence of the Japanese Otter."

In 1994, zoological experts visited the area where the excrement was found. They discovered remains of the animal's urine, which the animal is believed to leave during its courtship. The prefectural government of Kochi set up an infrared camera for six months from October 1994 to April 1995 in an effort to capture it on film, but all that was recorded were animals such as raccoon dogs.

Between March 4 and 9, 1996, a group of zoo officials, municipal government officials and animals lovers from across the country searched for the river otter in the areas where finds had been made in the past. Such areas included coastal areas in Susaki, areas along the Niyodo River running through Sakawacho and Inocho, and coastal areas along Shimanto River. No evidence of the animal's existence was found.

Among these, the presumed sighting reported in Kochi by a local artist with a detailed sketch was regarded "highly trustable" by Yoshihiko Machida, an emeritus professor at the Kōchi University in 2009. Dr. Machida also pointed that the previous studies by the prefecture had been restricted only among coastal areas and thus not filling the definition of extinct species by IUCN. Regarding this, a survey was conducted by Ehime Prefecture in 2014, noting several recent sightings.

In February 2017, a wild otter was caught on camera on Tsushima Island, Nagasaki Prefecture. However, this individual was later found to represent a Eurasian otter, which have since started to colonize the island, becoming the first otters in Japan in over 38 years.

Other uses 
The Japanese otter was used as medicine to help cure tuberculosis. Typically a dosage that would last about 40 days would cost roughly $300 US dollars. Beginning in the early 20th century, the otter pelts were used for military purposes as well. In 1929, the government established the "Hunters Association" which called upon people to hunt and skin these otters, which was one of the main causes of their eventual extinction.

In culture 
The Japanese otter was named the official animal symbol of Japan's Ehime Prefecture, a region of Japan in northwestern Shikoku.

References 

Otters
Carnivorans of Asia
Mammals of Japan
Endemic fauna of Japan
Extinct animals of Japan
Mammal extinctions since 1500
Species made extinct by human activities
Taxa named by John Edward Gray
Mammals described in 1989